Noah Finn Adams, known professionally as NOAHFINNCE, is a British singer-songwriter, multi-instrumentalist and YouTuber.

Biography

Early life 
Adams was raised in Ascot, England. His interest in music began when he was a young child. His dad introduced him to bands such as Nirvana, the Foo Fighters, and The Prodigy. The first band he can remember falling in love with is Busted. They inspired him to play guitar, although he only received an acoustic guitar at the time. During his teenage years, he became more involved in the pop punk and emo scene, looking up to bands such as My Chemical Romance, Pierce the Veil, and Neck Deep. He attended as many concerts as he could, meeting many of his best friends there.

YouTube
Adams initially posted singing covers on Instagram, but in 2015 he moved his covers to his YouTube channel, then known as "Triggerwarningrat" as Instagram imposed a 15-second limit on videos at the time. As his channel grew, he began posting more vlog content alongside his covers. In 2017, Adams used the platform to come out as transgender and shared his transition journey, posting regular testosterone and top surgery updates. In 2018, Adams released his first original single, Asthma Attack, posting a music video on YouTube. With more than 800,000 subscribers, Adams now posts content discussing LGBTQ+ topics alongside his covers and original music videos.

Signing to Hopeless Records
On 19 November 2020, Adams announced he had been signed to Hopeless Records. The announcement was accompanied by the release of the song "Life's A Bit", with the music video published the same day on his YouTube channel.

Personal life 
Adams publicly came out as a transgender man in 2017, and as bisexual in 2020. When Adams came out as transgender, he said "It came to the time when I was gonna start testosterone and things were gonna change very rapidly. So I decided I was going to come out and because I had already had an audience, people were asking a lot of questions and that realized that I could help people that were going through a similar thing to me." 2021, he was diagnosed with ADHD. He is lactose intolerant. Adams' first EP-STUFF FROM MY BRAIN was written before he started therapy and after he finished it, "I've learned a lot in therapy!" he explains. This being a moment in his life that changed after going to therapy making his approach to music better.

Discography

EPs

My Brain After Therapy (2022, Hopeless Records)
Stuff From My Brain (2021, Hopeless Records)

Singles

Adams is featured on the single “(NOT A) LOVE SONG“ by The Tyne, released in January 2023.

Tours

NOAHFINNCE Debut tour
Noahfinnce's debut tour was in September 2021, with 4 shows total in Southampton, Manchester, Bristol, and London. Supporting him were Bears in Trees, The Oozes, and The Tyne

US Tour 2022
In March 2022, Noahfinnce announced that he would be going on tour across America with Sophie Powers in May and June of that year. He played a total of 19 shows, 8 of which were sold out. Noahfinnce's second EP, "MY BRAIN AFTER THERAPY", was released in the midst of the tour, leading to extra hype surrounding unreleased or newly released songs.

Anatomy of a Rat UK Tour
Originally planned for January 2022, the tour was postponed until September due to COVID-19, with one show in May. This allowed many dates to get upgraded venues and/or additional dates. Supporting him were Sophie Powers and The Oozes. Multiple shows were sold out, and he played to his biggest crowd yet in Manchester with over 800 in the audience.

US Tour 2023
In December 2022, Adams announced his second US tour, planned for the spring of 2023 with Bears in Trees and Action/Adventure supporting him. There are 22 shows scheduled across the US and one show being in Canada.

Awards and nominations

References

External links
 
 NOAHFINNCE Label Biography
 NOAHFINNCE Last.Fm page

Guitarists
YouTube channels
LGBT men
LGBT rights activists
1999 births
Living people
British musicians
Pop punk singers
Musicians from Berkshire
Transgender male musicians
Bisexual singers
Transgender singers
YouTubers who make LGBT-related content